Sundel Bolong or Sundelbolong is a 1981 Indonesian cult horror film directed by Sisworo Gautama Putra. The film is about the Javanese mythical prostitute ghost Sundel Bolong and stars Suzzanna. A sequel to the film was made in 1984, Telaga Angker. A remake titled Suzzanna: Bernapas dalam Kubur, directed by Rocky Soraya and Anggy Umbara, was released on November 15, 2018.

Cast
Suzzanna
Barry Prima
Ruth Pelupessy
Rudy Salam
Marlia Hardi
Rukman Herman
HIM Damsyik
Eddy Bakar Pare
Jack John
Jafar Breel
Diana Suarkom

References

External links

 Sundelbolong at the Indonesia Film Database

1981 films
1981 horror films
Indonesian ghost films
Indonesian horror films
1980s ghost films
Films directed by Sisworo Gautama Putra